Michael Lazerow is a serial entrepreneur who has founded several successful media companies. In 2007, Michael co-founded Buddy Media, Inc., a privately held company that offers some of the world's largest brands social media solutions. Michael served as chairman and CEO before the company was sold to Salesforce.com on June 4, 2012, for $745 million.

In 2019, Michael co-founded Velvet Sea Ventures, a multi-stage venture capital firm. The firm has invested in Scopely and Liquid Death.

While attending Northwestern University, Michael founded University Wire (now owned by Columbia Broadcasting System (CBS)), a network of more than 700 student-run newspapers. He later founded GOLF.com, which was purchased by Time Warner's Time Inc. division in 2006.  Subsequent to the 2006 acquisition, Michael joined Time Inc. as General Manager of GOLF.com and GOLFONLINE.com. Michael also sits on the boards of Savored and Saving Star.

Michael lives in New York City with his wife, Kass, who serves as Buddy Media's COO, and their three children, Myles, Cole and Vivian. Michael graduated from Northwestern University with a B.S. and M.S. in journalism.

References

 Buddy Media
"College Newspapers Gain Venue on Search Services" in Chronicle of Higher Education June 12, 1998
 "Time Adds Golf.com to Its Sports Lineup" inWashington Post, Jan 24, 2006.
E-content story on GOLF.com
PR Newswire story

American male journalists
Medill School of Journalism alumni
Living people
Year of birth missing (living people)
American chief executives in the media industry